Iman Khaleel Shaalan al-Asadi (born 18 February 1964) is a Liberal Iraqi politician and former lawmaker of the Council of Representatives of Iraq.

Personal life
Al-Asadi was born in Karbala. She studied political science at the University of Cairo and International law at the University of Baghdad . In 2003 she was a professor of law at Al-Mustansiriya University .

Political career
Prior to her election in 2005 Al-Asadi was a member of some civil society organizations in Baghdad between 2004 and 2005. She was then nominated for the Western Constituency of Karbala for January 2005 elections. In 2005, Al-Asadi was elected one of advisors committee of Council of Representatives of Iraq. Al-Asadi was also a Member of the National Iraqi Alliance.

Books
Federalism In Iraq and impact on national unity

References

Brawl Halts Session of Iraqi Parliament

Dual Nationality of Officials Under Attack 

Bush administration concedes it may not finish US-Iraq deal before Bush leaves office

Living people
21st-century Iraqi women politicians
21st-century Iraqi politicians
Members of the Council of Representatives of Iraq
1964 births
Politicians from Karbala
Cairo University alumni
University of Baghdad alumni
Academic staff of Al-Mustansiriya University